The Enoch E. Cowdell House, at 595 N. 4th West in Beaver, Utah, was built around 1873.  It was listed on the National Register of Historic Places in 1982.

It was built as a hall and parlor plan house with end wall chimneys, and was expanded by two rear additions in the historic era.  It is notable in part for its construction of black rock (basalt).

References

National Register of Historic Places in Beaver County, Utah
Houses completed in 1873